|}
Enzo Alido Floreani (born 9 March 1945) is a former Australian politician. He was the member for Flynn in the Northern Territory Legislative Assembly from 1988 to 1990, as a member of Ian Tuxworth's NT Nationals party. Elected in a 1988 by-election, he and Tuxworth were the only representatives of the NT Nationals to win election; they were both defeated in 1990.

References

1945 births
Living people
Members of the Northern Territory Legislative Assembly
Northern Territory Nationals members of the Northern Territory Legislative Assembly